Araeoscelidia or Araeoscelida is a clade of extinct diapsid reptiles superficially resembling lizards, extending from the Late Carboniferous to the Early Permian.
The group contains the genera Araeoscelis, Petrolacosaurus, the possibly aquatic Spinoaequalis, and less well-known genera such as Kadaliosaurus and Zarcasaurus.
This clade is considered to be the sister group to all (currently known) later diapsids.

Description

Araeoscelidians were small animals (less than one meter in length) looking somewhat like lizards, though they are only distantly related to true lizards. They differ from other, earlier sauropsids by their slender limbs, their elongated tail, and of course by the presence of two temporal openings, the feature defining the diapsid condition. In Araeoscelis, only the upper temporal opening remains, thus resulting in a derived euryapsid condition.

Genera

Araeoscelidia includes well-known genera such as Araeoscelis Williston 1910, Petrolacosaurus Lane 1945 and Spinoaequalis, known from virtually complete skeletons. Zarcasaurus, Aphelosaurus and Kadaliosaurus belong to this clade, but are known only from post-cranial remains and a mandible fragment for Zarcasaurus.

The genus Dictybolos has been included in Araeoscelidia by Olson (1970) but this inclusion has been criticized e.g. by Evans (1988), especially since Olson also included distantly related groups such as protorosaurs and mesosaurs.

New specimens have been discovered in Oklahoma, United States but so far lack a scientific description.

Phylogeny
Phylogenetic relationships:

The majority of phylogenetic studies recover araeoscelidians as basal diapsids; however, Simões et al. (2022) recover them as stem-amniotes instead, as the sister group to the clade including Captorhinidae and Protorothyris archeri.

Stratigraphic and geographic distribution

Araeoscelidia are known from the Late Carboniferous in the United States (Petrolacosaurus, Spinoaequalis) to the Early Permian in France (Aphelosaurus), Germany (Kadaliosaurus) and the United States (Dictybolos, Zarcasaurus, Araeoscelis). Apart from araeoscelidans, only one other diapsid is known before the Late Permian: Orovenator from the Early Permian of Oklahoma.

References

Further reading 
 
 
 
 
 
 
 
 
 
 
 
 
 
 
 
 
 
 
 

Prehistoric diapsids
Pennsylvanian first appearances
Cisuralian extinctions
Taxa named by Samuel Wendell Williston
Fossil taxa described in 1913